The Gambino crime family (pronounced ) is an Italian-American Mafia crime family and one of the "Five Families" that dominate organized crime activities in New York City, United States, within the nationwide criminal phenomenon known as the American Mafia. The group, which went through five bosses between 1910 and 1957, is named after Carlo Gambino, boss of the family at the time of the McClellan hearings in 1963, when the structure of organized crime first gained public attention. The group's operations extend from New York and the eastern seaboard to California. Its illicit activities include labor and construction racketeering, gambling, loansharking, extortion, money laundering, prostitution, fraud, hijacking, and fencing.

The family was one of the five families that were founded in New York after the Castellammarese War of 1931. For most of the next quarter-century, it was a minor player in organized crime. Its most prominent member during this time was its underboss Albert Anastasia, who rose to infamy as the operating head of the underworld's enforcement arm, Murder, Inc. He remained in power even after Murder, Inc. was smashed in the late 1940s, and took over his family in 1951—by all accounts, after murdering the family's founder Vincent Mangano—which was then recognized as the Anastasia crime family.

The rise of what was the most powerful crime family in America for a time began in 1957, when Anastasia was assassinated while sitting in a barber chair at the Park Sheraton Hotel in Manhattan. Experts believe that Anastasia's underboss Carlo Gambino helped orchestrate the hit to take over the family. Gambino partnered with Meyer Lansky to control gambling interests in Cuba. The family's fortunes grew through 1976, when Gambino appointed his brother-in-law Paul Castellano as boss upon his death. Castellano infuriated upstart capo John Gotti, who orchestrated Castellano's murder in 1985. Gotti's downfall came in 1992, when his underboss Salvatore "Sammy the Bull" Gravano cooperated with the FBI. Gravano's cooperation brought down Gotti, along with most of the top members of the Gambino family. Beginning in 2015, the family was headed by Frank Cali until his assassination outside his Staten Island home on March 13, 2019.

History

Origins

D'Aquila gang

The origins of the Gambino crime family can be traced back to the faction of newly transplanted mafiosi from Palermo, Sicily who were originally led by Ignazio Lupo. When he and his partner by business and marriage, Giuseppe Morello, were sent to prison for counterfeiting in 1910, Salvatore "Toto" D'Aquila, one of Lupo's chief captains, took over. D'Aquila was an influential emigrant from Palermo who joined the Lupo gang based in East Harlem. Founded in the 1900s, the Lupo Mano Nera gang was one of the first Italian criminal groups in New York. Lupo was partner in many ventures with Morello, who was the original capo di tutti capi (boss of bosses), a title that would later be coveted by D'Aquila. As other gangs formed in New York, they acknowledged Morello as their boss of bosses. In 1906, D'Aquila's name first appeared on police records for running a confidence scam.

In 1910, Giuseppe Morello and Ignazio Lupo were sentenced to 30 years in prison for counterfeiting. With the Morello family weakened, D'Aquila used the opportunity to establish the dominance of what was now his own Palermitani family in East Harlem. D'Aquila quickly used his ties to other Mafia leaders in the United States to create a network of influence and connections and was soon a powerful force in New York.

New York gangs
By 1910, more Italian gangs had formed in New York City. In addition to the original Morello gang in East Harlem and D'Aquila's own, now growing gang, also in East Harlem (but expanding into Little Italy in Manhattan's Lower East Side), there were other organizations forming. In Brooklyn, Nicolo "Cola" Schirò established a second gang of Sicilian mafiosi from Castellammare del Golfo, west of Palermo, in Sicily. A third Sicilian gang was formed by Alfred Mineo in Brooklyn. Another Morello captain, Gaetano Reina, had also broken away in the Bronx, ruling that area with impunity. In south Brooklyn, first Johnny Torrio, then Frankie Yale were leading a new and rising organization. Finally, there were two allied Neapolitan Camorra gangs, one on Coney Island and one on Navy Street in Brooklyn, that were run by Pellegrino Morano and Alessandro Vollero.

In 1916 the Camorra had assassinated Nicholas Morello, head of the Morello gang. In response, D'Aquila allied with the Morellos to fight the Camorra. In 1917, both Morano and Vollero were convicted of murder and sentenced to life in prison. With their leadership gone, the two Camorra gangs disappeared and D'Aquila and the Schiro family in Brooklyn took over many of their rackets in Brooklyn. Soon after, D'Aquila absorbed the Mineo gang, making Mineo his first lieutenant. D'Aquila now controlled the largest and most influential Italian gang in New York City. It was about this time that Joe Masseria, another former Morello captain, began asserting his influence over the Lower East Side's Little Italy and began to come into conflict with D'Aquila's operations there, as Prohibition approached.

Prohibition
In 1920, the United States outlawed the production and sale of alcoholic beverages (Prohibition), creating the opportunity for an extremely lucrative illegal racket for the New York gangs.

By 1920, D'Aquila's only significant rival was Giuseppe "Joe the Boss" Masseria. Masseria had taken over the Morello family interests, and by the mid-1920s, had begun to amass power and influence to rival that of D'Aquila. By the late 1920s, D'Aquila and Masseria were headed for a showdown.

On October 10, 1928, Masseria gunmen assassinated Salvatore D'Aquila outside his home. D'Aquila's second-in-command, Alfred Mineo, and his right-hand man, Steve Ferrigno, now commanded the largest and most influential Sicilian gang in New York City.

Castellammarese War
In 1930, the Castellammarese War started between Masseria and Salvatore Maranzano, the new leader of Cola Schirò's Castellammarese gang, for control of Italian-American organized crime in New York. Mineo was a casualty; he and Ferrigno were shot dead during an assassination attempt on Masseria on November 5, 1930. In April 1931, Masseria was murdered in a restaurant by several of his gang members who had defected to Maranzano. Maranzano declared himself the boss of all bosses and reorganized all the New York gangs into five crime families. Maranzano appointed Frank Scalice as head of the old D'Aquila/Mineo gang, now designated as one of New York's new five families.

In September 1931, Maranzano was himself assassinated in his office by a squad of contract killers. The main beneficiary (and organizer of both hits) was Charlie "Lucky" Luciano. Luciano kept Maranzano's five families and added a Commission to mediate disputes and prevent more gang warfare.

Also in 1931, Luciano replaced Scalice with Vincent Mangano as head of the D'Aquila/Mineo gang, now the Mangano crime family. Mangano also received a seat on the new Commission. The modern era of the Cosa Nostra had begun.

Mangano era
Vincent Mangano now took over the family, with Joseph Biondo as consigliere and Albert Anastasia as underboss. Vincent Mangano still believed in the Old World mob traditions of "honor", "tradition", "respect" and "dignity." However, he was somewhat more forward-looking than either Masseria and Maranzano. To compensate for loss of massive revenues with the end of Prohibition in 1933, Vincent Mangano moved his family into extortion, union racketeering, and illegal gambling operations including horse betting, running numbers and lotteries.

Vincent Mangano also established the City Democratic Club, ostensibly to promote American values. In reality, the Club was a cover for Murder, Inc., the notorious band of mainly Jewish hitmen who performed contract murders for the Cosa Nostra nationwide. Anastasia was the operating head of Murder, Inc.; he was popularly known as the "Lord High Executioner".

Vincent Mangano also had close ties with Emil Camarda, a vice-president of the International Longshoremen's Association (ILA). Through the ILA, Mangano and the family completely controlled the Manhattan and Brooklyn waterfronts. From 1932 onward, the president of ILA Local 1814 was Anthony "Tough Tony" Anastasio, Albert Anastasia's younger brother (Anthony kept the original spelling of their last name). Anastasio was one of the family's biggest earners, steering millions of dollars in kickbacks and payoffs into the family's coffers. Anastasio made no secret of his ties to the mob; he only had to say "my brother Albert" to get his point across. With the family's backing, the Brooklyn waterfront was Anastasio's bailiwick for 30 years.

Around this time, Carlo Gambino was promoted within the Mangano family, along with another future boss, Gambino's cousin Paul Castellano.

Anastasia and Mangano were usually in conflict, even though they worked together for 20 years. On numerous occasions, Anastasia and Vincent Mangano came close to physical conflict. Vincent Mangano felt uncomfortable with Anastasia's close ties to Lucky Luciano, Frank Costello, Joseph Bonanno and other top mobsters outside his family. Mangano was also jealous of Anastasia's strong power base in Murder Inc. and the waterfront unions.

In April 1951, Vincent Mangano disappeared without a trace, while his brother Phillip was found dead. No one was ever charged in the Mangano brothers' deaths and Vincent's body was never found. However, it is generally believed that Anastasia murdered both of them.

Anastasia regime
Called to face the Commission, Anastasia refused to accept guilt for the Mangano murders. However, Anastasia did claim that Vincent Mangano had been planning to kill him. Anastasia was already running the family in Vincent Mangano's "absence" and the Commission members were intimidated by Anastasia. With the support of Frank Costello, boss of the Luciano crime family, the Commission confirmed Anastasia's ascension as boss of what was now the Anastasia crime family. Carlo Gambino, a wily character with designs on the leadership himself, maneuvered himself into the position of consigliere.

The former boss of Murder, Inc., Anastasia was a vicious murderer who inspired fear throughout the New York families. With Costello as an ally, Anastasia came to control the Commission. Costello's bitter rival was Vito Genovese, a former underboss for Lucky Luciano. Since 1946, Genovese had been scheming to remove Costello from power but was not powerful enough to face Anastasia.

Plot against Anastasia
Anastasia's own brutal actions soon created a favorable climate in New York for his removal. In 1952, Anastasia ordered the murder of a Brooklyn man, Arnold Schuster, who had aided in the capture of the bank robber Willie Sutton. Anastasia did not like the fact that Schuster had helped the police. The New York families were outraged by this gratuitous killing that raised a large amount of public furor. Anastasia also alienated one of Luciano's powerful associates, Meyer Lansky, by opening casinos in Cuba to compete with Lansky's. Genovese and Lansky soon recruited Carlo Gambino to the conspiracy by offering him the chance to replace Anastasia and become boss himself.

In May 1957, Frank Costello escaped a Genovese-organized murder attempt with a minor injury and decided to resign as boss. However, Genovese and Gambino soon learned that Costello was conspiring with Anastasia to regain power. They decided to kill Anastasia.

On October 25, 1957, several masked gunmen murdered Anastasia in the barbershop at the Park Sheraton Hotel in Manhattan. As Anastasia sat in the barber's chair, the three assailants rushed in, shoved the barber out of the way, and started shooting. The wounded Anastasia allegedly lunged at his killers, but only hit their reflections in the wall mirror. Anastasia died at the scene. Many historians believe that Gambino ordered caporegime Joseph Biondo to kill Anastasia and Biondo gave the contract to a squad of Gambino drug dealers led by Stephen Armone and Stephen Grammauta.

Gambino era

With Anastasia's death, Carlo Gambino became boss of what was now called the Gambino crime family. Joseph Biondo was appointed underboss; he was, by 1965, replaced by Aniello Dellacroce.

Gambino and Luciano then allegedly provided a part of the $100,000 paid to a Puerto Rican drug dealer to falsely implicate Genovese in a drug deal. In April 1959, Genovese was sentenced to 15 years in federal prison, where he died in 1969.

Gambino quickly built the family into the most powerful crime family in the United States. He was helped by Meyer Lansky's offshore gaming houses in Cuba and the Bahamas, a lucrative business for the Cosa Nostra.

Control of other crime families
In 1964, Joseph "Joe Bananas" Bonanno, the head of the Bonanno crime family, and Joseph Magliocco, the new boss of the Profaci crime family, conspired to kill Gambino and his allies on the Commission. However, the man entrusted with the job, Joseph Colombo, instead revealed the plot to Gambino. The Commission, led by Gambino, forced Magliocco to resign and hand over his family to Colombo, while Bonanno fled New York. Gambino then became the most powerful leader of the "Five Families".

In 1971, Gambino allegedly used his power to orchestrate the shooting of Colombo. Gambino and his allies were unhappy about Colombo's high public profile. Jerome Johnson shot Colombo on June 28, 1971 at the second "Italian-American Unity Day" rally; Johnson was then shot and killed on the spot by Colombo's bodyguards. Johnson was tentatively linked to the Gambino family, but no one else was charged in the shooting. Colombo survived the shooting, but remained paralyzed until his death in 1978.

Gambino's influence also stretched into behind-the-scenes control of the Lucchese crime family, led by Carmine "Mr. Gribbs" Tramunti.

In 1972, Gambino allegedly picked Frank "Funzi" Tieri to be front boss of the Genovese crime family. Gambino had allegedly ordered the murder of Tieri's predecessor Thomas Eboli after Eboli failed to repay a $3 million loan to Gambino. Others believe that Eboli was killed by his own crime family for his erratic ways.

Under Gambino, the family gained particularly strong influence in the construction industry. It acquired behind-the-scenes control of Teamsters Local 282, which controlled access to most building materials in the New York City area and could literally bring most construction jobs in New York City to a halt.

On October 15, 1976, Carlo Gambino died at home of natural causes. Against expectations, he had appointed Castellano to succeed him over his underboss Dellacroce. Gambino appeared to believe that his crime family would benefit from Castellano's focus on white collar businesses. Dellacroce, at the time, was imprisoned for tax evasion and was unable to contest Castellano's succession.

Castellano's succession was confirmed at a meeting on November 24, with Dellacroce present. Castellano arranged for Dellacroce to remain as underboss while directly running traditional Cosa Nostra activities such as extortion, robbery, and loansharking. While Dellacroce accepted Castellano's succession, the deal effectively split the Gambino family into two rival factions.

Castellano regime

When Castellano became boss, he negotiated a division of responsibilities between himself and Dellacroce. Castellano took control of the so-called "white collar crimes" that included stock embezzlement and other big money rackets. Dellacroce retained control of the traditional Cosa Nostra activities. To maintain control over the Dellacroce faction, Castellano relied on the crew run by Anthony "Nino" Gaggi and Roy DeMeo. The DeMeo crew allegedly committed from 74 to 200 murders during the late 1970s and mid-1980s.

As Castellano became more powerful in the Gambino family, he started to make large amounts of money from construction concrete. Castellano's son Philip was the president of Scara-Mix Concrete Corporation, which exercised a near monopoly on Staten Island on construction concrete. Castellano also handled the Gambino interests in the "Concrete Club," a club of contractors selected by The Commission to handle contracts between $2 million and $15 million. In return, the contractors gave a two percent kickback of the contract value to The Commission. Castellano also supervised Gambino control of Teamsters Union Local Chapter 282, which provided workers to pour concrete at all major building projects in New York and Long Island.

Gambino family case
In response to the rise of the Gambino family, federal prosecutors targeted the family leadership. On March 31, 1984 a federal grand jury indicted Castellano and 20 other Gambino members and associates with charges of drug trafficking, murder, theft, and prostitution. The following year, he received a second indictment for his role in the Mafia's Commission. Facing life imprisonment for either case, Castellano arranged for Gotti to serve as an acting boss alongside Thomas Bilotti, Castellano's favorite capo, and Thomas Gambino in his absence.

Conflict with Gotti
Castellano's most vocal critic was John Gotti, a Queens-based capo and Dellacroce protégé. Gotti was ambitious and wanted to be boss himself. Gotti rapidly became dissatisfied with Castellano's leadership, regarding the new boss as being too isolated and greedy. Like other members of the family, Gotti also personally disliked Castellano. The boss lacked street credibility, and those who had paid their dues running street level jobs did not respect him. Gotti also had an economic interest: he had a running dispute with Castellano on the split Gotti took from hijackings at Kennedy Airport. Gotti was also rumored to be expanding into drug dealing, a lucrative trade Castellano had banned.

In August 1983, Ruggiero and Gene Gotti were arrested for dealing heroin, based primarily on recordings from a bug in Ruggiero's house. Castellano, who had banned made men from his family from dealing drugs under threat of death, demanded transcripts of the tapes, and, when Ruggiero refused, threatened to demote Gotti.

Gotti began conspiring with fellow disgruntled capos Frank DeCicco and Joseph "Joe Piney" Armone and soldiers Sammy Gravano and Robert "DiB" DiBernardo (collectively dubbed "the Fist" by themselves) to overthrow Castellano, insisting, despite the boss' inaction, that Castellano would eventually try to kill him. Armone's support was critical; as a respected old-timer who dated back to the family's founder, Vincent Mangano, he would lend needed credibility to the conspirators' cause.

It has long been a rule in the Mafia that killing a boss is forbidden without the support of a majority of the Commission. Indeed, Gotti's planned hit would have been the first attack on a boss since Albert Anastasia was killed in 1957. Gotti knew that it would be too risky to solicit support from the other four bosses, since they had longstanding ties to Castellano. To get around this, he got the support of several important figures of his generation in the Lucchese, Colombo and Bonanno families. He did not consider approaching the Genovese family, as Castellano had close ties with Genovese boss Vincent "Chin" Gigante. However, Gotti could also count on the complicity of Gambino consigliere Joseph N. Gallo.

After Dellacroce died of cancer on December 2, 1985, Castellano revised his succession plan: appointing Bilotti as underboss to Thomas Gambino as the sole acting boss, while making plans to break up Gotti's crew. Infuriated by this, and Castellano's refusal to attend Dellacroce's wake, Gotti resolved to kill his boss.

On December 16, 1985, Bilotti and Castellano arrived at Sparks Steak House in Manhattan for a dinner meeting with capo Frank DeCicco. DeCicco had tipped off Gotti that he would be meeting with Castellano and several other Gambino mobsters at Sparks that evening. As Bilotti and Castellano were exiting their car, four unidentified men under Gotti's command shot them to death. Gotti watched the hit from his car with Gravano.

John Gotti

Several days after the Castellano murder, Gotti was named to a three-man committee, along with Gallo and DeCicco, to temporarily run the family pending the election of a new boss. It was also announced that an internal investigation into Castellano's murder was underway. However, it was an open secret that Gotti was acting boss in all but name, and nearly all of the family's capos knew he had been the one behind the hit. He was formally acclaimed as the new boss of the Gambino family at a meeting of 20 capos held on January 15, 1986.

Gotti appointed Frank DeCicco as underboss and promoted Angelo Ruggiero and Sammy Gravano to capo. At the time of his takeover, the Gambino family was regarded as the most powerful American mafia family, with an annual income of $500 million.

Gotti was known as "The Dapper Don", renowned for his hand-tailored suits and silk ties. Unlike his colleagues, Gotti made little effort to hide his mob connections and was very willing to provide interesting sound bites to the media. His home in Howard Beach, Queens was frequently seen on television. He liked to hold meetings with family members while walking in public places so that law enforcement agents could not record the conversations. One of Gotti's neighbors in Howard Beach was Joseph Massino, underboss of the Bonanno crime family. Gotti and Massino had a longstanding friendship dating back to the 1970s when they were known as two of the most proficient truck hijackers in New York.

Mob leaders from the other families were enraged at the Castellano murder and disapproved of Gotti's high-profile style. Gotti's strongest enemy was Genovese crime family boss Vincent "Chin" Gigante, a former Castellano ally. Gigante conspired with Lucchese boss Anthony "Tony Ducks" Corallo to have Gotti killed. Corallo gave the contract to two top members of his family, Vittorio "Vic" Amuso and Anthony "Gaspipe" Casso.

Gotti's newfound fame had at least one positive effect for Gotti; upon the revelation of his attacker's occupation, and amid reports of intimidation by the Gambinos, Romual Piecyk decided not to testify against Gotti thanks to Boško "The Yugo" Radonjić, the head of the Westies in Hell's Kitchen, Manhattan. When the trial began in March 1986, Piecyk testified he was unable to remember who attacked him. The case was promptly dismissed, with the New York Post summarizing the proceedings with the headline "I Forgotti!" It was later revealed that Gambino thugs had severed Piecyk's brake lines, made threatening phone calls, and stalked him before the trial.

On April 13, 1986, DeCicco was killed when his car was bombed following a visit to Castellano loyalist James Failla. The bombing was carried out by Victor Amuso and Anthony Casso of the Lucchese family, under orders of Gigante and Lucchese boss Anthony Corallo, to avenge Castellano and Bilotti by killing their successors; Gotti also planned to visit Failla that day, but canceled, and the bomb was detonated after a soldier who rode with DeCicco was mistaken for the boss. Bombs had long been banned by the Mafia out of concern that it would put innocent people in harm's way, leading the Gambinos to initially suspect that "zips"—Sicilian mafiosi working in the U.S.—were behind it; zips were well known for using bombs.

Following the bombing, Judge Eugene Nickerson, presiding over Gotti's racketeering trial, rescheduled the trial to avoid a jury tainted by the resulting publicity, while prosecutor Diane Giacalone had Gotti's bail revoked due to evidence of witness intimidation in the Piecyk case. From jail, Gotti ordered the murder of Robert DiBernardo by Gravano; both DiBernardo and Ruggiero had been vying to succeed DeCicco until Ruggiero accused DiBernardo of challenging Gotti's leadership. When Ruggiero, also under indictment, had his bail revoked for his abrasive behavior in preliminary hearings, a frustrated Gotti instead promoted Armone to underboss.

Jury selection for the racketeering case began again in August 1986, with Gotti standing trial alongside Willie Boy Johnson (who, despite being exposed as an informant, refused to turn state's evidence), Leonard DiMaria, Tony Rampino, Nicholas Corozzo and John Carneglia. At this point, the Gambinos were able to compromise the case when George Pape hid his friendship with Radonjić and was empaneled as juror No. 11. Through Radonjić, Pape contacted Gravano and agreed to sell his vote on the jury for $60,000.

In the trial's opening statements on September 25, Gotti's defense attorney Bruce Cutler denied the existence of the Gambino family and framed the government's entire effort as a personal vendetta. His main defense strategy during the prosecution was to attack the credibility of Giacalone's witnesses by discussing their crimes committed before their turning state's evidence. During Gotti's defense, Cutler called bank robber Matthew Traynor, a would-be prosecution witness dropped for unreliability, who testified that Giacalone offered him drugs and her panties as a masturbation aid in exchange for his testimony; Traynor's allegations would be dismissed by Judge Nickerson as "wholly unbelievable" after the trial, and he was subsequently convicted of perjury.

Despite Cutler's defense and critiques about the prosecution's performance, according to mob writers Jerry Capeci and Gene Mustain, when the jury's deliberations began, a majority were in favor of convicting Gotti. However, due to Pape's misconduct, Gotti knew from the beginning of the trial that he could do no worse than a hung jury. During deliberations, Pape held out for acquittal until the rest of the jury began to fear their own safety would be compromised. On March 13, 1987, they acquitted Gotti and his codefendants of all charges. Five years later, Pape was convicted of obstruction of justice for his part in the fix and sentenced to three years in prison.

In the face of previous Mafia convictions, particularly the success of the Mafia Commission Trial, Gotti's acquittal was a major upset that further added to his reputation. The American media dubbed Gotti "The Teflon Don" in reference to the failure of any charges to "stick."

1992 conviction
On December 11, 1990, FBI agents and NYPD detectives raided the Ravenite Social Club, arresting Gravano, Gotti and Locascio. Gravano pleaded guilty to a superseding racketeering charge, and Gotti charged with five murders (Castellano, Bilotti, DiBernardo, Liborio Milito and Louis Dibono), conspiracy to murder Gaetano Vastola, loansharking, illegal gambling, obstruction of justice, bribery and tax evasion. Based on tapes from FBI bugs played at pretrial hearings, the Gambino administration was denied bail. At the same time, attorneys Bruce Cutler and Gerald Shargel were disqualified from defending Gotti and Gravano after prosecutors successfully contended they were "part of the evidence" and thus liable to be called as witnesses. Prosecutors argued that Cutler and Shargel not only knew about potential criminal activity, but had worked as "in-house counsel" for the Gambino family. Gotti subsequently hired Albert Krieger, a Miami attorney who had worked with Joseph Bonanno, to replace Cutler.

The tapes also created a rift between Gotti and Gravano, showing the Gambino boss describing his newly appointed underboss as too greedy and attempting to frame Gravano as the main force behind the murders of DiBernardo, Milito and Dibono. Gotti's attempt at reconciliation failed, leaving Gravano disillusioned with the mob and doubtful of his chances of winning his case without Shargel, his former attorney.

Gravano ultimately opted to turn state's evidence, formally agreeing to testify on November 13, 1991. At the time, he was the highest-ranking member of a New York crime family to turn informer.

Gotti and Locascio were tried in the U.S. District Court for the Eastern District of New York before District Judge I. Leo Glasser. Jury selection began in January 1992 with an anonymous jury and, for the first time in a Brooklyn federal case, fully sequestered during the trial due to Gotti's reputation for jury tampering. The trial commenced with the prosecution's opening statements on February 12; prosecutors Andrew Maloney and John Gleeson began their case by playing tapes showing Gotti discussing Gambino family business, including murders he approved, and confirming the animosity between Gotti and Castellano to establish the former's motive to kill his boss. After calling an eyewitness of the Sparks hit who identified Carneglia as one of the men who shot Bilotti, they then called Gravano as a witness on March 2.

On the stand, Gravano confirmed Gotti's place in the structure of the Gambino family and described in detail the conspiracy to assassinate Castellano, giving a full description of the hit and its aftermath. Gravano confessed to 19 murders, implicating Gotti in four of them. Neither Krieger nor Anthony Cardinale, Locascio's attorney, were able to shake Gravano during cross-examination. Among other outbursts, Gotti called Gravano a junkie while his attorneys sought to discuss his past steroid use. After presenting additional testimony and tapes, the government rested its case on March 24.

On June 23, 1992, Glasser sentenced Gotti and Locascio to life imprisonment without the possibility of parole and a $250,000 fine. Gotti surrendered to federal authorities to serve his prison time on December 14, 1992. On September 26, 1994, a federal judge sentenced Gravano to five years in prison. However, since Gravano had already served four years, the sentence amounted to less than one year.

Gotti continued to rule the family from prison, while day-to-day operation of the family shifted to capos John "Jackie Nose" D'Amico and Nicholas "Little Nick" Corozzo. The latter was due to take over as acting boss but was himself sentenced to eight years in prison on racketeering charges. Gotti's son John "Junior" Gotti took over as head of the family, but he pled guilty to racketeering in 1999 and was sentenced to 77 months in jail.

Peter Gotti 
Peter Gotti took over control of the family some time likely in 2001 before his brother John Gotti died in prison on June 10, 2002. With Peter Gotti in charge the family's fortunes dwindled to a remarkable extent, given their power a few decades ago when they were considered the most powerful criminal organization in America. Peter Gotti was imprisoned in 2003, and the leadership allegedly went to administration members Nicholas Corozzo, Jackie D'Amico, and Joseph Corozzo. Peter Gotti remained the official boss while in prison.

Gotti's rivals regained control of the family, mostly because the rest of Gotti's loyalists were either jailed or under indictments. Michael "Mikey Scars" DiLeonardo, the former head of the family's white collar operations and one of the last Gotti supporters, turned state's evidence due to increased law enforcement pressure and credible evidence to be presented in his racketeering trial and due to the administration shelving him accusing him of stealing money from the family. He chose to testify against mobsters from all of the Five Families. DiLeonardo testified against Peter Gotti and Anthony "Sonny" Ciccone, among others, from 2003 to 2005, and then disappeared into the Witness Protection Program.

In 2005, Nicholas "Little Nick" Corozzo and his longtime underling Leonard "Lenny" DiMaria were released from prison after serving ten years for racketeering and loansharking charges in New York and Florida. That same year, US law enforcement recognized Corozzo as the boss of the Gambino crime family, with his brother Joseph Corozzo as the family consigliere, Arnold "Zeke" Squitieri as the acting underboss, and Jackie D'Amico as a highly regarded member with the Corozzo brothers.

On Thursday, February 7, 2008, a federal grand jury issued an indictment which led to the arrest of 54 Gambino family members and associates in New York City, its suburbs, New Jersey, and Long Island. This indictment was the culmination of a four-year FBI investigation known as Operation Old Bridge. It accused 62 people of murder, conspiracy, drug trafficking, robberies, extortion, and other crimes. The FBI used informant Joseph Vollaro as a government witness.

Operation Old Bridge broke up a growing alliance between the Gambinos and the Sicilian Mafia, which wanted to get further into the drug trade. One of those arrested in the raids in the US was Frank Cali, future boss of the Gambino family. He was allegedly the "ambassador" in the US for the Inzerillo crime family. Most of those arrested ended up pleading guilty, thus getting sentenced less than three years in prison.

Domenico Cefalù and Frank Cali
When federal and New York State authorities rounded up the entire Gambino family hierarchy in early 2008, a three-man panel of street bosses Daniel "Danny" Marino, John Gambino and Bartolomeo Vernace took control of the Gambino family while the administration members were in prison. In July 2011, it was reported that Domenico Cefalù had been promoted to acting boss of the crime family, putting an end to the Gotti reign. Cefalù's reign saw the Sicilian faction, better known as "Zips", gain control of the Gambino crime family. It was reported by crime reporter Jerry Capeci that Cefalù stepped down in 2015 and his underboss, Frank Cali, took full control. However, a week later, Capeci issued a correction reporting that Cefalù remained the acting boss. The  family was believed to have between 150 and 200 members as well as over 1100 associates.

The family continued to be active in a variety of criminal enterprises, including gambling, loansharking, extortion, labor racketeering, fraud, money laundering and narcotic trafficking. In 2012 the Gambino family still had some control on piers in Brooklyn and Staten Island through infiltrated labor unions. Indictments from 2008 to 2014 showed that the family was still very active in New York City.

During 2009, the Gambino family saw many important members released from prison. On November 18, 2009, the NYPD arrested 22 members and associates of the Luchese and Gambino crime families as part of "Operation Pure Luck". The raid was a result of cases involving loansharking and sports gambling on Staten Island. There were also charges of bribing New York City court officers and Sanitation Department officials.

In 2014, FBI and Italian police arrested 17 members and associates of the 'ndrangheta Mafia, in particular the Ursino clan, and 7 members and associates of the Gambino and Bonanno families. The arrested were accused by prosecutors and law enforcement officials of organizing a transatlantic drug ring with the aim of shipping 500 kg of pure cocaine from Guyana in South America to the port of Gioia Tauro in Calabria. US Attorney Loretta Lynch singled out Gambino family associate Franco Lupoi as the linchpin of the operation, accusing him of conspiring with his father-in-law, Nicola Antonio Simonetta, a member of the Ursino clan, to set up the network.

On December 12, 2017, five associates of the Gambino family, Thomas Anzaone, Alessandro "Sandro" Damelio, Joseph Durso, Anthony Rodolico, and Anthony Saladino, along with 74-year-old captain John "Johnny Boy" Ambrosio, were arrested and accused of operating an illegal racketeering enterprise from January 2014 to December 2017, involving racketeering, extortion, drug trafficking, loansharking and illegal gambling. Bonanno crime family soldier, Frank "Frankie Boy" Salerno, was also arrested and accused of conspiring with the Gambino crime family. Associates Anzaone, Damelio and Durso, together with Bonanno soldier Saladino, were alleged to have sold cocaine, marijuana and Xanax in large quantities. Prosecutors said Salerno and Saladino sourced the drugs in kilograms then sold it to the others to be distributed. An undercover agent alleged that he paid $1,250 for an ounce of cocaine and also bought nearly a kilogram in 12 different sales between February and June in 2016.

Ambrosio was said to have been the head of a very profitable loansharking and illegal gambling operation, including unlicensed gambling parlors, electronic gaming machines and internet sports betting. Prosecutors said that he and Rodolico attempted to obstruct the federal grand jury proceeding into their criminal activities by intimidating a loan shark victim into lying to law enforcement.

Frank Cali was shot dead on March 13, 2019 outside his home on Staten Island by a lone gunman. Cali's murder was the first murder of a boss since the 1985 assassination of Paul Castellano. Three days later, 24-year-old Anthony Comello was arrested and charged with the murder. Authorities reportedly believe the crime was related to a personal dispute rather than any organized crime activity.

Current position and leadership 
Following Cali's death, it was reported that Lorenzo Mannino had become the new Gambino leader.

On March 14, 2019, Gambino family associate Anthony Pandrella was indicted for the murder and robbery of 77-year-old loan shark Vincent Zito on October 26, 2018. According to court papers, Pandrella murdered Zito out of fear that he would kill him first over an unpaid $750,000 debt he owed him. The day he was supposed to pay the debt, Pandrella visited Zito at his home in Sheepshead Bay, Brooklyn and shot him at point-blank range in the back of the head, stealing Zito's loan business' assets and cleaning up any incriminating evidence at the scene before getting out of the house. Hours after murdering him, Pandrella came back to his house to tend to Zito's family and friends and question them about developments in the police homicide investigation. On June 14, 2022, Pandrella was found guilty of robbery, murder, and unlawful use of a firearm. He was sentenced to 40 years in prison on October 6, 2022.

In July 2019, Thomas Gambino, 47, (considered by the FBI to be a significant member of the Gambino family) was one of 15 suspected members of the Inzerillo crime family arrested in coordinated raids in Sicily and the United States. Italian police said Gambino was caught on video meeting with ranking members of the Inzerillo clan on a speedboat off the coast of Palermo a year earlier, allegedly discussing the sale of property formerly owned by Frank Cali. Rosario Gambino was also arrested.

On December 5, 2019, Gambino family capo Andrew Campos and nine other gangsters were arrested in a federal mob crackdown in the Bronx and Westchester County, on allegations of threats of violence to extort money. On December 6, John Simonlacaj, cousin of Mark “Chippy” Kocaj and a managing director of the HFZ Capital Group was arraigned in Brooklyn Federal Court on federal charges of wire fraud conspiracy and tax fraud. Prosecutors alleged that CWC Contracting, operated by Kocaj, Campos and Vincent Fiore, paid bribes to employees of numerous construction companies and real estate developers, including HFZ Capital.

On January 18, 2023, Gambino family capo Frank "Calypso" Camuso, soldier Louis Astuto and associate Robert "Rusty" Baselice were indicted along 20 other defendants including Genovese family soldier Christopher "Jerry" Chierchio, and 26 companies by the Manhattan District Attorney's Office for a kickback scheme operated by Baselice, the vice president of the Grimaldi Group, a firm which allegedly received $4.2 million from contractors. From April 2013 to July 2021, Baselice reportedly used his position to steal from his firm's developer clients by providing inside information about competitors' bids to subcontractors, among other offenses. According to the indictment, Astuto and family associate Paul Noto distributed a portion of the proceeds from the kickbacks to companies Camuso and his family owned.

Historical leadership
The Gambino crime family had a hierarchical structure similar to the other Italian-American mafias. Their commander in chief, the “boss” was the oversight for the entire group. The second in command, the “underboss”, was usually a close relative or friend of the boss. They were expected to take over (in most cases) as the successor to the boss if he were to go to prison or die. The boss had a Consigliere who was the mentor to the  boss, who assisted him on decision making. The Capo’s were in charge of the crews of soldiers, and were over a territory of New York City. They ensured the crews of lower-ranked members were following the rules from the Boss and moving forward with the organization’s goals. The “soldiers” were doing most of the work for the crime family, and they would be sworn into the system and used as runners for the family. Within the soldiers, there were “earners” and “enforcers”. The earners would push revenue and get the cash for the organization and the enforcers would utilize violent acts if necessary and if they were told to do so by the Boss. The soldiers were “made” men, which meant that they were protected from being killed unless the Boss approves of it. The lowest members from the organization were called “associates”, who would commit criminal acts for the organization but were not “made”. The benefit of being an associate would be the distance from the organization, including the oath that the associate wouldn’t have to make for the mafia.

Boss (official and acting)
 1900s–1910 – Ignazio "the Wolf" Lupo – imprisoned in 1910.
 1910–1928 – Salvatore "Toto" D'Aquila – took over the Brooklyn Camorra in 1916 and merged with Al Mineo's gang forming the largest family in New York. He was killed on orders of boss Joe Masseria in 1928.
 1928–1930 – Manfredi "Alfred" Mineo – killed in Castellammarese War in 1930.
 1930–1931 – Frank Scalice – stepped down and became consigliere, after the murder of boss of all bosses Salvatore Maranzano.
 1931–1951 – Vincent Mangano – disappeared in April 1951, allegedly killed on orders of underboss Albert Anastasia.
 1951–1957 – Albert Anastasia – murdered in October 1957 on orders of Carlo Gambino.
 1957–1976 – Carlo Gambino – died of natural causes in 1976.
 Acting 1964–1976 – Paul Castellano – acting boss for Gambino, became official boss after his death.
 1976–1985 – Paul Castellano – murdered in December 1985 on orders of capo John Gotti.
 1985–2002 – John Gotti – imprisoned in 1990, died in 2002.
 Acting 1991–1999 – John A. Gotti – imprisoned in 1999, later retired.
 Acting 1999–2002 – Peter Gotti – promoted to official boss.
 2002–2011 – Peter Gotti – imprisoned in 2002, died in 2021.
 Acting 2002–2005 – Arnold Squitieri
 Acting 2005–2008 – John D'Amico
 2011–present – Domenico "Italian Dom" Cefalù
Acting 2015–2019 – Frank Cali – murdered in March 2019.
 Acting 2019–present – Lorenzo Mannino

Committees
From Gotti's imprisonment in 1990, several capo committees have periodically replaced the underboss and consigliere positions, allowing an imprisoned boss better control of the family.
 1986 – Angelo Ruggiero (died 1989), Joseph Armone (died 1992), Salvatore Gravano (until 1987 when he became consigliere), Frank Locascio (until 1990 when he became consigliere)
 1990–1991 – John A. Gotti, James Failla, John D'Amico, Louis Vallario, Peter Gotti
 1991–1993 – John A. Gotti, James Failla, John D'Amico, Joseph Arcuri, Peter Gotti
 1993–1996 – John A. Gotti, Nicholas Corozzo, John D'Amico, Joseph Arcuri, Peter Gotti
 1996–1999 – John A. Gotti, Stephen Grammauta, John D'Amico, Joseph Arcuri, Peter Gotti
 2008–2010 – Daniel Marino (jailed), Bartolomeo Vernace (jailed), and John Gambino
 2013–2016 – John Gambino (died 2016), Anthony Gurino, Joseph Juliano
2016–2019 – Anthony Gurino (died 2019), Joseph Juliano

Underboss (official and acting)
 1928–1930 – Stefano Ferrigno – killed in 1930.
 1930–1951 – Albert Anastasia – became official boss in 1951.
 1951–1957 – Salvatore Chiri
 1957 – Carlo Gambino – became boss.
 1957–1965 – Joseph Biondo – demoted by Gambino in 1965.
 1965–1985 – Aniello Dellacroce – died of natural causes in 1985.
 Acting 1974–1976 – James Failla – replaced by Dellacroce after release from prison.
 1985 – Thomas Bilotti – murdered in 1985 on orders of capo John Gotti after 11 days.
 1985–1986 – Frank DeCicco – murdered in 1986 by Lucchese family hitmen.
 1986–1990 – Joseph Armone – sentenced to 15 years in prison in 1987, became consigliere.
 Acting 1988–1990 – Frank Locascio – became acting consigliere.
 1990–1991 – Salvatore Gravano – turned government witness in 1991.
 1999–2012 – Arnold Squitieri – arrested in 2005, released in 2012.
 Acting 1999–2002 – Stephen Grammauta – retired.
 Acting 2002–2005 – Anthony Megale – arrested in 2005.
 Acting 2005–2011 – Domenico Cefalù – became boss.
 2012–2015 – Frank Cali – became acting boss.
 2015–2017 – Giovanni "John" Gambino – died of natural causes, on November 16, 2017.
 2018–2019 – Lorenzo Mannino – became acting boss.

Consigliere (official and acting)
 1931–1957 – Frank Scalice – murdered in 1957.
 1957 – Joseph Biondo – became underboss.
 1957–1967 – Joseph Riccobono – retired in 1967, deceased in 1975.
 1967–1987 – Joseph N. Gallo – demoted
 1987–1990 – Salvatore Gravano – became underboss.
 1990–1992 – Joseph Armone – former underboss, died in prison 1992.
 Acting 1990–1992 – Frank Locascio – convicted 1992.
 1992–2011 – Joseph Corozzo – imprisoned in 2008, released January 5, 2016.
 2011–2017 – Bartolomeo "Bobby Glasses" Vernace – arrested 2011, convicted 2014, died in prison 2017.
Acting 2014–2018 – Lorenzo Mannino – became underboss 
Acting 2018–2019 – Michael "Mickey Boy" Paradiso – became official consigliere.
 2019–present – Michael "Mickey Boy" Paradiso

Administration
 Boss – Domenico "Italian Dom" Cefalù – despite rumours and speculation over the years, Cefalù has continued his reign as official boss since 2011. Born in Palermo in 1947. He became involved through the drug trade. Not much is known about Cefalù due to his deliberate "low-key" presence other than his 1982 heroin trafficking sentence; he served six years. He was inducted by John Gotti in 1991. In 1992 and 1993, he refused to testify against Pasquale Conte and was given an 18-month imprisonment; released in February 1994. Around 1995 or 1996, he was sentenced to 33 months for criminal contempt. In the mid-2000s, Jackie D'Amico promoted Cefalù as acting underboss, until his succession to boss in 2011.
 Acting boss – Lorenzo Mannino – suspected of being part of the top administration, at least regarded as a former respected and powerful captain in Brooklyn. Mannino was implicated by Sammy Gravano in the 1988 killing of Francesco Oliveri. He was formerly part of the "Sicilian faction" and also an acquaintance of John Gambino. In 1994, he was sentenced to 15 years and fined $25,000 for drug trafficking and racketeering.
Underboss – Unknown/Vacant
 Consigliere – Michael "Mickey Boy" Paradiso – reportedly promoted in 2019. He has been active since the 1960s. In the 1970s, he assaulted John Gotti and was appointed as captain by Gotti in the mid-1980s. Paradiso has been suspected of hiring Jimmy Hydell and two other associates in the failed September 1985 murder attempt of Lucchese crime family underboss Anthony Casso. By 1986, he completed his eight-year sentence of the hijacking of two trailer-trucks containing 500 bags of Colombian coffee and was released on $500,000 bail, when he was convicted of operating a major heroin distribution network at Lewisburg Penitentiary. It has been alleged Gotti ordered a contract on his life around late 1987 as retribution for Casso. In 1989, he was acquitted of murder after his own brother accused him of committing a January 1978 murder among nine others. He was paroled in 1998, returned to prison in 1999 on a parole violation then released in 2000. Paradiso was released in 2011 for an unknown crime. In 2016, he and 21 other members and associates of the Gambino, Bonanno and Genovese crime families were indicted as part of an illegal gambling and $15 million marijuana and oxycodone drug operation which stretched from California to New York.

Caporegimes
During the 1980s and 90s, the Gambino crime family had 24 active crews operating in New York City, New Jersey, Long Island, South Florida, and Connecticut. By 2000, the family had approximately 20 crews. However, according to a 2004 New Jersey Organized Crime Report, the Gambino family had only ten active crews.

Brooklyn faction
Dominick "Big D" Cefalù – capo of a Brooklyn crew, and first cousin to boss Domenico Cefalù. Cefalù was indicted in 2011 on extortion and illegal gambling counts for threatening and shaking down a man over a $500,000 debt.
Nicholas "Little Nick" Corozzo – capo operating from Brooklyn and Queens. Corozzo has an extensive history in the family that dates back to the reign of John Gotti. A stellar earner for the family, Corozzo became a captain in the family following Gotti's imprisonment in 1992. In 1996, he was indicted in Miami and struck with racketeering charges including loansharking, attempted murder, and arson. He was convicted and released on 2004, however was indicted once again in 2008. Charged with racketeering and enterprise corruption, as well as the murder of Robert Arena and Thomas Matranga, Corozzo fled New York but surrendered to authorities months later. He plead guilty and was sentenced to 13 years in prison. He was released from prison in 2019. He is the brother of fellow Gambino members Blaise Corozzo and Joseph Corozzo, the family's former consigliere.
Ernest "Ernie" Grillo – capo with operations in Brooklyn, Grillo has had a criminal record that dates back to the 1980s. In 1988, Grillo was one of several Gambino members and associates that was indicted and charged with numerous charges, including racketeering, extortion, loansharking, enterprise corruption, and murder. Grillo, then 32 years old and identified as a soldier, was identified as the leader of the crew, whose criminal ventures included extorting a building landlord of $50,000 due to his refusal of lending the building out to a mob-operated casino, and forcing a gas station owner to give up his office to the crew for meeting purposes. He was later sentenced to serve 11 years in prison. In February 2008, Grillo was one of many organized crime figures from several NY LCN families indicted. He was accused of extorting cement profits at the construction site of a New Jersey NASCAR track.
Joseph "Sonny" Juliano – capo of a Brooklyn crew that operates illegal gambling, loansharking, fraud and wire fraud activities. In 2003, Juliano was indicted for his role in managing a multimillion-dollar illegal gambling ring in 30 New York City locations. He pleaded guilty and was sentenced to two to four years in prison, as well as being fined $550,000 in gambling proceeds to the state and $37,000 in back taxes.
 John Rizzo – capo with operations in Brooklyn, Staten Island and Manhattan. Rizzo was invited to the wedding of Gambino mobster Joseph Virzi in 2012, but had to be removed at the pressure of authorities since he is a known felon.

Staten Island faction
Frank "Calypso" Camuso – capo of a Staten Island crew. on January 18, 2023, Camuso was indicted along with soldier Louis Astuto, associate Robert "Rusty" Baselice and 20 other defendants and 26 companies by the Manhattan District Attorney's Office for a kickback scheme operated by Baselice, the vice president of the Grimaldi Group, a firm which allegedly received $4.2 million from contractors. According to the indictment, Astuto and family associate Paul Noto distributed a portion of the proceeds from the kickbacks to companies Camuso and his family owned.
 Carmine Sciandra – capo of a crew in Staten Island who also co-owns three "Top Tomato" vegetable and fruit markets. In December 2005, Sciandra was shot and wounded by a retired policeman while working at his Staten Island market. On March 25, 2010, Sciandra pled guilty to state charges of enterprise corruption and grand larceny for running a massive sports betting and loan shark operation and was sentenced to serve between 1½ to 4½ years in prison. He was released on January 5, 2012.

Queens faction
 Thomas "Tommy Sneakers" Cacciopoli – capo of a crew in Queens, New Jersey, and Westchester. A top lieutenant of John A. Gotti during his time as Acting Boss, Cacciopoli was indicted on March 9, 2005 on charges of extortion, and was again indicted on February 8, 2008 for his part in the extortion of trucking companies at the NASCAR track site in Staten Island. He was released from prison on April 4, 2011.
 Thomas "Monk" Sassano – capo of the Queens crew formerly headed by Alphonse Trucchio before his 2011 imprisonment, Sassano was involved with an extortion scheme in the 2000s along with captain Salvatore Scala. The two extorted the owner of a Manhattan strip club and used it as a training ground for family associates.

Manhattan faction
Salvatore "Mr. Sal" Franco – capo of a Manhattan crew, Franco is the nephew of former family captain Joe Arcuri. Franco is a former union president and is the brother of Joseph Franco, who runs a restaurant located in the former Queens home of actor Rudolph Valentino.
Louis Mastrangelo – capo with operations in Manhattan. Mastrangelo, along with former captain Alphonse Trucchio and other family members, were sentenced in 2012 for various crimes, including conspiracy, loansharking, and illegal gambling.

Bronx faction
 Andrew "Andy Campo" Campos – capo operating in the Bronx and Westchester. In December 2019, Campos was indicted along with Richard Martino, Vincent Fiore and others on charges of racketeering conspiracy, bribery, fraud and obstruction of justice. In the 2019 indictment authories revealed that Campos made numerous visits to imprisoned Frank LoCascio. In January 2021, he pleaded guilty and was sentenced to 37 months in prison and was given a $15,000 fine.

New Jersey
Louis "Bo" Filippelli – New Jersey mobster who took over Alphonse Sisca's crew due to Sisca's growing age. Filippelli was a top confidant of former underboss and acting boss Arnold Squitieri, serving as "street boss" of the family's New Jersey operations. He was convicted and sent to prison in 2006, along with Sisca.
Nicholas "Nicky Mita" Mitarotonda – capo of a crew in Elizabeth, New Jersey. In August 1996, he was sentenced to almost seven years in prison for running a loan sharking operation and fined $40,000. Mitarotonda was also convicted of running an illegal gambling business worth $5 million however the charges were dropped as he agreed to a plea agreement. He was released in 2002. He was released from federal prison on March 1, 2011.

Sicilian faction
The Sicilian faction of the Gambino crime family is known as the Cherry Hill Gambinos. Gambino boss Carlo Gambino created an alliance between the Gambino family and three Sicilian clans: the Inzerillos, the Spatolas and the Di Maggios. Carlo Gambino's relatives controlled the Inzerillo clan under Salvatore Inzerillo in Passo di Ragano, a neighborhood in Palermo, Sicily. Salvatore Inzerillo coordinated the major heroin trafficking from Sicily to the US, bringing his cousins John, Giuseppe and Rosario Gambino to the US to supervise the operation. The Gambino brothers ran a Cafe on 18th Avenue in Bensonhurst and took their name Cherry Hill Gambinos from Cherry Hill, New Jersey. The Gambino family in America began increasing in size with more Sicilian members.

News reports in July 2019 indicated that a recent police investigation confirmed strong links between the Palermo area Cosa Nostra and the Gambino crime family in New York. According to Italian newspaper La Repubblica,  "Off they go, through the streets of Passo di Rigano, Boccadifalco, Torretta and at the same time, Brooklyn, Staten Island, New Jersey. Because from Sicily to the US, the old mafia has returned".

Soldiers
Vincent "Little Vinny Dirtbag" Artuso – former Capo controlling the Florida faction, Artuso was convicted of racketeering on October 3, 2008, along with his son John. Artuso was released from federal prison on July 28, 2016.
Louis Astuto – soldier operating from Staten Island and Manhattan. The son of acting capo Louis "Louie Fats" Astuto, he followed his father into the Gambino family and currently owns three companies in Staten Island. On January 18, 2023, Astuto was indicted by the Manhattan District Attorney's Office along with capo Frank "Calypso" Camuso and 21 other defendants, as well as 26 companies for a kickback scheme that stole approximately $4.2 million from Manhattan contractors. According to the indictment, Astuto and family associate Paul Noto distributed a portion of the proceeds from the kickbacks to companies Camuso and his family owned.
 Salvatore "Tore" LoCascio – former Capo of a Bronx crew and son of Frank LoCascio. Along with Richard Martino, Salvatore introduced the Gambinos to online pornography operations that earned the family up to $350 million per year. In 2003, Salvatore was convicted and sent to prison. He was released from prison on August 1, 2008.
Alphonse "Funzi" Sisca – former Capo operating a crew in New Jersey. He was a John Gotti ally and a former drug dealing partner of Angelo Ruggiero and Arnold Squitieri. Prior to being convicted in 2006, Sisca had spent 20 of the past 30 years in prison. He was released from prison on September 27, 2010.
Leonard "Lenny" DiMaria former Capo with operations in Florida. DiMaria served as a top associate of John Gotti during his reign.
Anthony "Sonny" Ciccone – Soldier of the Gambino crew on the Brooklyn waterfront. Ciccone was convicted on extortion charges in 2003. He was released from prison on April 24, 2013.
Blaise Corozzo – Soldier and another of the Corozzo brothers. He is serving a one to three-year sentence in state prison for a 2008 illegal gambling operation. His son Nicholas Corozzo, also involved with the Gambino family, was arrested in 2004. In 2009, Blaise Corozzo was released from prison.
Vincent "Vinny Butch" Corrao – former capo of a Manhattan crew. Vincent's grandfather, "Vinny the Shrimp", operated the same crew and passed it to his son Joseph Corrao. Joseph later passed the crew to his son Vincent.
Gene Gotti – Soldier in the Gambino family. He is a brother of John, Peter, Richard, and Vincent Gotti.
 Richard G. Gotti – Soldier in the Gambino family and served as a member of his father Richard V. Gotti's crew. He is a nephew of John, Peter, Gene, and Vincent Gotti and cousin of former acting boss John A. Gotti.
 Vincent Gotti – soldier in the Gambino family. Vincent is the youngest of the Gotti brothers and was inducted as a made man in 2002, the year his brother John died. In 2008, Vincent pled guilty to 8 years in prison for attempted murder and was released on February 22, 2015.
 Michael Murdocco – Soldier in Carmine Sciandra's crew. Murdocco and his son-in-law Sanitation Deputy Chief Frederick Grimaldi, rigged bids to help a New Jersey firm win a sanitation contract. In exchange for kickbacks, Grimaldi allegedly leaked bid information to Murdocco in May 2009. Currently serving two to six years in state prison after pleading guilty in March 2010 to enterprise corruption, grand larceny and receiving bribes. Murdocco was paroled on July 7, 2012.
Louis "Louie Bracciole" Ricco – Gotti-era capo of a crew in the Bronx, Brooklyn, and New Jersey. The crew had illegal gambling, loansharking and racketeering activities in the Bronx.
Joseph Sclafani – current soldier who used to operate in Staten Island. Before his 2013 sentence of cocaine and marijuana trafficking, he was planning on marrying Ramona Rizzo, a star on Mob Wives. Rizzo is also the granddaughter of deceased Bonanno crime family soldier Benjamin Ruggiero. Sclafani was a friend and drug partner of Bonanno family associate Costabile Farace and was also alongside him when he was murdered in 1989, having been seriously wounded himself. He is the son of recently deceased Gambino captain Augustus Sclafani. He was released on August 4, 2019.
 Rosario Spatola – Member of the Cherry Hill Gambinos. His cousin was John Gambino and his brother-in-law was Salvatore Inzerillo.
 Louis Vallario – current Gambino family soldier and influential member during the 1980s. He was a close and trusted friend of John Gotti. Due to Gotti's incarceration, he led the family as a member of the Ruling Panel which consisted of other Gambino family members, until 2002. Vallario was most recently released from prison in 2013.
Michael Matterazzo – current Gambino family soldier, he is allegedly a member of the old Anthony Gurino crew.

Imprisoned members
 Gennaro "Jerry" Bruno – currently serving a 21-year prison sentence for shooting drug dealer Martin Bosshart in the back of his head over a marijuana dispute in 2002 in Queens; convicted for the crime in May 2017. Gambino associate Todd LaBarca was convicted for his role in the murder in 2012 and was sentenced to 23 years in prison. The 82nd Attorney General Eric Holder refused to seek the death penalty for Bruno. He held a top ranking position within the official Gambino crime family crew the Ozone Park Boys. He is a close ally of consigliere Joseph Corozzo and previously sided with his faction in the family.
Andrew Merola – Former acting capo of the Mitarotonda crew. Merola is connected to Lucchese crime family Jersey faction leader Martin Taccetta. Merola's crew operates illegal gambling, loansharking, extortion and labor racketeering. Pleaded guilty to racketeering conspiracy and was sentenced to 11 years in prison. His projected release date was June 5, 2020.
 Aniello "Neil" Lombardo – a soldier who was imprisoned in 2011 being convicted of conspiring to drug trafficking between 2008 and 2011. He was sentenced to 14 years in prison.
 Michael Roccaforte – a reputed rising star in the Gambino family. He was reported to be the only member from the Gambino family under the rank of Captain to attend the 2010 conference consisting of members from the New York crime families and the Philadelphia crime family. He served under capo Alphonse Trucchio, son of Ronnie Trucchio. Roccaforte was sentenced alongside Anthony Moscatiello for racketeering, selling narcotics, gambling, loansharking and numerous other offenses. He was released on December 14, 2018.
 Paul Semplice – soldier given a 28-month prison term for running a loan-sharking operation in March 2019.

Associates 

 Joseph "Joe the German" Watts – high-ranking associate convicted in 2011 for his part in a 1989 murder conspiracy ordered by John Gotti. He is currently imprisoned at FCI Cumberland, and is scheduled for release in March 2022.
 Steven Kaplan – A family associate who was the manager of the Gold Club, a strip club in Atlanta, Georgia. He employed women to provide sexual services in his club.
 Anthony Pandrella – Associate from Brooklyn, Pandrella was arrested on March 13, 2019 for the robbery and murder of Vincent Zito, a Gambino-affiliated loan shark who was killed on October 26, 2018.

Other territories
The Gambino family operates primarily in the New York City area; their main rackets are illegal gambling and labor racketeering.
 New York City – The Gambino family operates in all five boroughs of New York as well the New York suburbs. The family operates numerous illegal gambling and loansharking throughout the area.
New Jersey – The Gambino family operates in Northern New Jersey counties of Bergen, Passaic, and Essex Counties. The family also operates in Southern New Jersey in South Trenton, and Atlantic City. In 2004, it was reported that two Gambino crews operated in New Jersey.
Florida – The Gambino family's Florida faction operates in Tampa and the South Florida counties of Broward, Palm Beach and Dade.

Crews
 Cherry Hill Gambinos (headed by John Gambino)
 Howard Beach Crew
 The Ozone Park Boys
 Los Angeles Crew

Defunct
 Baltimore Crew

Alliances with other criminal groups

The Gambino-Lucchese-Genovese
(1953–1985) between Carlo Gambino, Tommy Lucchese, and Vito Genovese began with a plot to take over the Mafia Commission by murdering family bosses Frank Costello and Albert Anastasia. At that time, Gambino was Anastasia's new underboss and Vito Genovese was the underboss for Costello. Their first target was Costello on May 2, 1957. Costello survived the assassination attempt, but immediately decided to retire as boss in favor of Genovese. Their second target was Anastasia on October 25, 1957. The Gallo brothers (from the Colombo family) murdered Anastasia in a Manhattan barber shop, opening the war for Gambino to become the new boss of the now-Gambino crime family. After assuming power, Gambino started conspiring with Lucchese to remove their former ally Genovese. In 1959, with the assistance of Lucky Luciano, Costello, and Meyer Lansky, Genovese was arrested and Gambino assumed full control with Lucchese of the Mafia Commission. Under Gambino and Lucchese, the Commission pushed Bonanno boss Joseph Bonanno out of power, triggering an internal war in that family. In the 1960s, the Commission backed the Gallo brothers in their rebellion against Profaci family boss Joe Profaci. In 1962, Gambino's oldest son Thomas married Lucchese's daughter, strengthening the Gambino and Luchese family alliance. Lucchese gave Gambino access into the New York airports rackets he controlled, and Gambino allowed Lucchese into some of their rackets. After Lucchese death in July 1967, Gambino used his power over the Commission to appoint Carmine Tramunti as the new Luchese family leader. Gambino later continued the alliance with Tramunti's successor, Anthony Corallo. After Gambino's death, new Gambino boss Paul Castellano continued the Luchese alliance. In 1985, the original Gambino-Luchese alliance dissolved when John Gotti ordered Castellano's assassination and took power in the Gambino family without Commission approval.

The Gambino-Lucchese
(1999–present) was initiated by acting Luchese boss Steven Crea in 1999. The two families extorted the construction industry and made millions of dollars in bid-rigging. In early 2002, Luchese capo John Capra worked with Gambino acting boss Arnold Squitieri, acting underboss Anthony Megale, and Bronx-based acting capo Gregory DePalma. The group was involved in illegal gambling and extortion activities in Westchester County, New York. The members were arrested in 2005 leading to the revelation that Gambino acting capo DePalma had allowed an FBI agent Joaquín García (known as Jack Falcone) work undercover with his crew since 2002. In late 2008, Gambino family acting capo Andrew Merola teamed with Luchese Jersey faction acting boss Martin Taccetta in an illegal gambling ring, shaking down unions, and extorting car dealerships. Merola was indicted in 2008 and Taccetta was returned to prison in 2009.

The Gambino-Genovese
(1962–1972) was between Carlo Gambino and Genovese family acting boss/front boss Thomas Eboli. The alliance was short-lived because Eboli was unable or unwilling to repay Gambino money from a bad narcotics deal. The alliance ended when Gambino ordered Eboli's murder on July 16, 1972.

The Gambino-Bonanno
(1991–2004) started with John Gotti and new Bonanno boss Joseph Massino. As a member of the Mafia Commission, Gotti helped Massino regain the Bonanno commission seat that was lost in the early 1970s. The Gambino family influenced the Bonanno family to give up narcotics trafficking and return to more traditional Cosa Nostra crimes (loan sharking, gambling, stock fraud, etc.) By the late 1990s, the Bonannos had become almost as strong as the Gambinos.

The Gambino-Westies
(1970s–1990s) this alliance resulted from an ongoing war between the Genovese family and the Westies, an Irish-American street gang in the Hell's Kitchen section of Manhattan. Genovese front boss Anthony "Fat Tony" Salerno wanted to seize control of lucrative construction rackets at the new Jacob Javits Convention Center from the Westies. When the Westies balked, Salerno ordered the murder of the top gang leaders. Eventually, the Genovese family invited the Gambinos to broker a peace agreement with the Westside Gang. As part of this agreement, the Westies formed an alliance with Gambino soldier Roy DeMeo.

The Gambino-Corleonesi
This association was revealed in May 2019 when news reports indicated that a Cosa Nostra insider revealed that John Gotti of the Gambino family had sent one of their explosives experts to Sicily to work with the Corleonesi Mafia clan. This individual allegedly helped plan the Capaci bombing that was set by Giovanni Brusca to kill prosecuting judge Giovanni Falcone and his team. One mafia expert was surprised that the two groups would cooperate because the American Cosa Nostra was affiliated with the rivals of the Corleonesi. But another expert said the joint effort was understandable. "It may be that the Gambinos at a certain point recognised that the Corleonesi had been victorious in the war between rival families in Sicily  ... there is nothing unusual in the traffic of personnel and ideas across the Atlantic ... they were cousin organisations," according to John Dickie, professor of Italian studies at University College London and the author of Mafia Republic – Italy's Criminal Curse.

Government informants and witnesses
 Alphonso "The Peacemaker" Attardi – the first confirmed Gambino crime family informant. Attardi was born in Sicily in 1897 and allegedly joined the Sicilian Mafia before immigrating to New York in 1919. He became a bootlegger and joined the D'Aquila gang during the 1920s – later evolved into the Gambino crime family. It is noted that Attardi was heavily involved in the narcotic trade from the 1930s to late 1940s. By 1947, he was an informant for the FBN and by 1952, Attardi was informing on the American Mafia, he disappeared shortly thereafter. Attardi gave an interview to columnist Jack Anderson in 1968. Depending on the sources, he died in 1970 or 1972 in Suffolk County, New York.
 Alfredo "Freddie the Sidge" Santantonio – he was initiated into the Gambino family in 1953. Santantonio was reportedly very close to Albert Anastasia and he was also the brother-in-law of Jack Parisi, a Gambino soldier and former Murder, Inc gunman. It is believed Santantonio became an informant in 1961. In 1962, he avoided a prison sentence for attempting to sell stolen bonds, with two other criminals. On July 11, 1963, he was shot 5 times and killed by two men whilst inside of a Brooklyn florist shop.
 Wilfred "Willie Boy" Johnson – former associate and confidant of John Gotti. He could never become a member of the Gambino family due to his Native-American heritage, for which he was named "Wahoo". Johnson became an informer in 1966 for the FBI due to apparent dissatisfaction with the mob. During a public hearing in 1985, federal prosecutor Diane Giacalone revealed that Johnson was cooperating with law enforcement. Johnson immediately refused to enter the Witness Protection Program and was subsequently murdered on August 29, 1988. Bonanno crime family hitmen Vincent "Kojak" Giattino and Thomas Pitera murdered Johnson as a favor for Gotti, Johnson was reportedly shot 19 times and found face-down in a pool of his own blood.
 Dominick Montiglio – former associate who testified in 1983. He attended the wake of Gambino underboss Frank Scalise in 1957 with his uncle and future Gambino capo Nino Gaggi. In 1973, he met Roy DeMeo, then an associate in the Gambino family, and Chris Rosenberg. He served as an errand boy for his uncle which required him to collect payments from the DeMeo crew. DeMeo had offered him the opportunity of selling narcotics however Gaggi ordered Montiglio not to get involved. Montiglio was involved in the April 1975 attempted murder of Vincent Governara. He fled to California in 1979 after believing Roy DeMeo and his uncle Nino Gaggi were planning to murder him, after Gambino boss Paul Castellano heard gossip of Montiglio selling and using heroin. His testimony in 1983 led Gaggi to be sentenced to 5 years in prison, where he would die in 1988. His testimony has brought down at least 60 American Mafia mobsters, with a confirmed number of 56 people before vanishing into the Witness Protection Program in 1983.
 James Cardinali – born in 1950. He is a former Gambino crime family associate who testified against John Gotti in December 1986. In 1975, he was given a four-year sentence for possession of weapons and drugs. Cardinali first met Gotti at the Clinton correctional facility in the late 1970s before he was transferred to Attica and Gotti to Green Haven.  Cardinali was released from the program in July 1989 by confiding his identity. He admitted to participating in 5 murders.
 Dominick "Big Dom" LoFaro – former associate. In 1983 or 1984, depending on the source, LoFaro attempted to sell a kilogram of heroin to undercover FBI and DEA agents, he shortly became an informer after his arrest due to the fact that he faced over 20 years in prison. In 1986, he was one out of three American Mafia informers to testify against Gambino boss John Gotti, alongside James Cardinali and Colombo crime family associate, Salvatore Polisi. LoFaro received probation for his testimony against Gotti. On 7 January 1987, he admitted to fabricating stories in order to make a deal with the government. He later admitted to murdering Salvatore Calabria at his home in 1982, and served as an accomplice in the murder of Calabria's wife in 1983. Also during January 1987, he pled guilty to attempted murder, illegal gambling and loan sharking. He died in 2003.
 Salvatore "Sammy the Bull" Gravano – the first underboss to break his blood oath. Gravano admitted to the killings of 19 people and cooperated with the government in 1991. He also admitted to fixing John Gotti's trials, which led Gotti to be called "the Teflon Don" due to his evasion from prosecution. He was released from prison in 1994 and immediately entered the Witness Protection Program which allowed him to flee to Arizona under protection. Gravano gave several publicised interviews, including with Dianne Sawyer, however Peter Gotti ordered a death-contract on Gravano after his 1999 Vanity Fair interview. The plan consisted of murdering Gravano with a land mine or shooting him with a hunting rifle. After his 2002 drug-related arrest, the assigned Gambino hitmen, Thomas "Huck" Carbonaro and Eddie Garafola, planned to send a nail bomb into his prison cell via mail. Gravano was released from prison in 2017.
 Dominic "Fat Dom" Borghese – former soldier. He served in the crew of Jackie D'Amico and later John A. Gotti. Borghese was very close with John A. Gotti, he even attended his wedding in 1990 and were partners together in several lucrative Staten Island illegal bookmaking operations; he later testified against him in 1998. Borghese admitted to helping dispose of 2 murdered bodies however he was unable to dig underneath due to the fact that he weighed over 400 pounds. He entered the Witness Protection Program in 1995. He testified against high-ranking Gambino associate Joe Watts.
 Andrew DiDonato – he was a former associate of the Gambino family and protegee of former Gambino acting boss and captain, Nicholas Corozzo. DiDonato was suspected of participating in 2 murders. He became an informant in 1997 and later testified against John A. Gotti.
 Craig DePalma – son of deceased Gambino acting captain Gregory DePalma. DePalma was a soldier and was proposed for membership by John Gotti, he later served in the crew of John A. Gotti. He cooperated in 2000 and died in December 2010 from eight years spent in a coma after a failed jailhouse suicide in 2002.
 Michael "Mickey Scars" DiLeonardo – former Gambino capo. DiLeonardo was active since the 1960s. His brother was shot to death in 1981 in a dispute related with the Gambino and Colombo crime families, DiLeonardo was denied permission to avenge the murder by boss Paul Castellano. He was inducted into the Gambino crime family alongside John A. Gotti on December 24, 1988. In 1989, he helped arrange the murder of publisher and sanitation business owner Fred Weiss, who was shot to death by the New Jersey DeCavalcante crime family as a favor to John J. Gotti. He became a government witness shortly after his June 2002 arrest; he was accused of labor racketeering, extortion, loan sharking, witness tampering, and the murder of Fred Weiss. He later testified against former Gambino boss Peter Gotti, captain Louis Vallario, hitman Michael Yanotti, Richard G. Gotti and the brother of John Gotti, Richard V. Gotti. His testimony has secured the convictions of more than 80 American Mafia members and associates.
 Frank "Frankie Fapp" Fappiano – former soldier. He allegedly became a Gambino soldier during the early 1990s and decided to cooperate in 2002. Fappiano has a brother in the Colombo crime family. He admitted to corruption, bribery and the extortion of construction companies based in Manhattan and Brooklyn, with the Genovese crime family. During one incident, Anthony Graziano, the consigliere of the Bonanno crime family, managed to obtain the "kickback" for a $22 million building contract at MDC Brooklyn, which the Gambino family also rivalled for.
 Primo Cassarino – former soldier and was part of Anthony Ciccone's crew. He was convicted of racketeering and extortion in 2003, alongside former boss Peter Gotti and several other Gambino members. In 2004, he was additionally convicted of racketeering, money-laundering and for the extortion of action-film star Steven Seagal. Cassarino became a government witness in 2005 after he was sentenced to over 11 years in prison. In 2005, he confessed about the infiltration of the International Longshoremen's Association. He testified in the trial of Genovese capo Lawrence Ricci in November 2005, who was later murdered a few weeks after, and also testified against Gambino soldier Anthony "Todo" Anastasio.
John Alite – former associate who testified against John A. Gotti and hitman Charles Carneglia. Alite pleaded guilty to two murders, four murder conspiracies, at least eight shootings and two attempted shootings as well as armed home invasions and armed robberies in New York, New Jersey, Pennsylvania and Florida. His testimony against Carneglia resulted in the defendant receiving a life sentence after being found guilty of four murders. On April 26, 2011, Alite was sentenced to 10 years in prison, however was released in January 2012.
 Joseph "Little Joe" D'Angelo – former soldier who cooperated in 2005. D'Angelo was once the driver for John A. Gotti. He testified against Gotti alongside former Bonanno crime family captain Dominick Cicale in 2009. He confessed to 2 murders and served as the driver during the attempted murder of Curtis Sliwa in 1992. Former United States federal judge Shira Scheindlin announced at his July 2012 trial that D'Angelo's testimony has brought down at least 40 mobsters, he was sentenced to four years time already served.
 Lewis Kasman – former associate. He was close to the Gotti family. John Gotti considered Kasman as a son. He cooperated in 2005. In 2015, he was arrested on felony grand theft and fraud charges in Florida. Kasman reportedly lived in a $900,000 mansion on Delray Beach.
 Robert Mormando – former soldier and hitman for the Gambino crime family. In October 2009, Mormando became the first mobster to admit in open court that he is gay. He was involved in the 2003 shooting of a Queens bagel store owner.
 Nicholas "Nicky Skins" Stefanelli – former soldier who was active in New Jersey, he was a member of Nicholas Corozzo's crew. He became an informant in 2010. Stefanelli reportedly murdered an informant in February 2011, Joseph Rossi, who he blamed for forcing him into becoming an informer. He committed suicide two days after he murdered Rossi, he was found dead in a hotel room.
 Anthony Ruggiano Jr. – former associate and proposed member. He is the son of Gambino captain Anthony Ruggiano Sr, who died in 1999. He lured his brother-in-law, Frank "Geeky" Boccia, to his death in 1988, Ruggiano spent three days in prison for his role in the murder after his cooperation in 2012. Ruggiano later testified against high-ranking members of the Gambino, including Dominick Pizzonia, Bartolomeo "Bobby Glasses" Vernace and hitman Charles Carneglia.
 Giovanni "Johnny" Monteleone – former associate who turned informer in 2013. Sopranos actor Tony Darrow asked Monteleone and Gambino soldier Joseph Orlando to recover money from a debt owed to him. Facing extortion charges, it was revealed in 2013 that Monteleone had cooperated, he received no prison time.

Former Gambino family mobsters
 Anthony "Tough Tony" Anastasio – brother of Albert Anastasia. Anastasio held control of the Brooklyn docks until his death in 1963.
Bartholomew "Bobby" Boriello – born in 1944, Boriello was one of John Gotti's top bodyguards. He was assassinated in 1991 on orders of Lucchese underboss Anthony Casso.
Roy DeMeo – ran the DeMeo crew, DeMeo was known for the excessive amount of brutal murders and dismemberment of rival criminals that took place in the "Gemini Lounge", the crew's hideout. He was shot and killed in 1983.
William "Billy Batts" Bentvena – also known as William Devino, Bentvena was a racketeer and drug smuggler. His infamous murder by Thomas DeSimone was portrayed in the film Goodfellas.
Carmine "Charley Wagons" Fatico – born in 1910, Fatico served as a capo and was an early mentor to John Gotti.
Paolo "Paul" Gambino – born in 1904. Former captain and younger brother of Carlo Gambino. In 1970, he was accused by police of establishing a heroin pipeline in the city of Toronto with Paolo Violi, Rocco Zito and Vincenzo Cotroni. He died in 1973.
Joseph "Joe the Blond" Giordano – capo, Giordano was the brother of John "Handsome Jack" Giordano, a Gotti-era capo. died of lung cancer in 2013.
Carmine "The Doctor" Lombardozzi – Gambino capo, Lombardozzi held near-total control over the family's stock market and shylock rackets. Lombardozzi was once described as having a "brilliant mind" for numbers. Lombardozzi had a long criminal history and tallied up numerous arrests. 
Pasquale Marsala – born in 1940, Marsala served as a capo under Frank Cali and Lorenzo Mannino's leadership, with operations in Brooklyn and Manhattan. In 1974, he was indicted for his part in a multimillion-dollar illegal gambling operation in which police officers were bribed. He died in 2021.
Alphonse "Funzi" Mosca – born in 1913. Former soldier and major heroin wholesale trafficker. He was a confidante of Gambino boss Paul Castellano. He died in 1987.
Ralph "Ralphie Bones" Mosca – capo during John Gotti's reign.
Frank "Big Frank" Pasqua Sr. – born in 1923. Former Gambino family soldier and major drug trafficker with known contacts in the Chicago Outfit. In December 1952, he was arrested in New York for trafficking several kilos of heroin to Chicago from New York on a weekly basis, the district supervisor in Chicago alleged the price of heroin increased by $100 an ounce due to the arrest of Pasqua and his Chicago associates. He was given a four-year prison sentence in 1958 for heroin conspiracy. Pasqua and his son were arrested on 9 December 1982 as part of operation "Major Supplier" which allegedly earned $25,000 per week from 1979 to 1982 and oversaw 15 percent of the heroin distributed wholesale in the city of New York, or about 400 pounds of heroin per year. He was convicted in 1984 for heroin conspiracy.
Frank Piccolo – caporegime with family operations in Bridgeport, Connecticut. He was shot and killed in 1981 on orders of Paul Castellano, reportedly for his attempt at overtaking Genovese rackets in Connecticut.
Angelo "Quack Quack" Ruggiero – close friend of John Gotti, Ruggiero died of cancer in 1989.
Gaetano Russo – born in Palermo, Sicily in 1891. By 1969, he was identified as a captain in the Gambino family by the federal government. He died in 1970.
Anthony Scotto
 Arthur "Artie Todd" Tortorello – born in 1913. Former soldier in the crew of Carmine Lombardozzi. He was heavily involved in stock fraud notable for his 1964 arrest which saw investors lose over $2 million in a bank and stock fraud case. He died in 1980.
 Anthony "Tony Pepsi" Vitta – born in 1938. Former soldier and confidante of Joseph N. Gallo. In December 1987, he was sentenced to 10 years in prison and fined $250,000 for obstruction of justice, racketeering and the extortion of a photography color laboratory and a Bronx construction firm. He died in 2018.

List of murders committed/ordered by the Gambino crime family

Media adaptations
The Gambino family has been featured in several films. The 1994 film Getting Gotti showcases a 1980s prosecution of Gambino boss John Gotti (portrayed by Tony Denison). Witness to the Mob was a made-for-television movie about the life of Gambino underboss turned FBI informant Sammy Gravano. In the 2001 TV movie, Boss of Bosses, actor Chazz Palminteri portrays Gambino boss Paul Castellano. In the 1996 TV movie Gotti, actor Armand Assante portrays Gambino boss John Gotti. In the movie Goodfellas, Gambino family made member William "Billy Batts" DeVino (played by Frank Vincent) is killed in a fight with Thomas DeSimone (portrayed as "Tommy DeVito" by Joe Pesci) a Lucchese crime family associate. The 2018 film Gotti, a commercial and critical flop, stars John Travolta in the titular role.

References

Further reading 

 Capeci, Jerry. The Complete Idiot's Guide to the Mafia. Indianapolis: Alpha Books, 2002. 
 
 Jacobs, James B., Christopher Panarella and Jay Worthington. Busting the Mob: The United States Vs. Cosa Nostra. New York: NYU Press, 1994. 
 Maas, Peter. Underboss: Sammy the Bull Gravano's Story of Life in the Mafia. New York: HarperCollins Publishers, 1997.

External links

 Seize The Night: Gambino Crime Family
 Gambino Mafia Leadership 2009
 Gambino Mafia News

 
Organizations established in the 1910s
1910s establishments in New York City
Organizations based in New York City
Five Families
Gangs in Connecticut
Gangs in Florida
Gangs in New Jersey
Gangs in New York City